Alexandra (died 20 April 1434 in Płock) was the youngest daughter of Algirdas, Grand Duke of Lithuania, and his second wife, Uliana of Tver. Though Alexandra's exact date of birth is not known, it is thought that she was born in the late 1360s or early 1370s. In 1387, she married Siemowit IV, Duke of Masovia, and they had thirteen children.

Life
On 12 December 1385, few months after the Union of Krewo, Siemowit IV, Duke of Masovia, reached a compromise with king Jadwiga of Poland and her intended consort king Jogaila (Władysław II Jagiełło), brother of Alexandra. Siemowit IV agreed to cease his rival claims to the Kingdom of Poland, pay homage to Jadwiga and Jogaila, and to assume position of a hereditary vassal to the Polish Crown in exchange for 10,000 Prague groschen and fief Duchy of Belz. The agreement was solidified by marriage of Siemowit IV and Alexandra in 1387.

Alexandra died and was buried in Płock. Her final resting place is likely a church of the Dominican Order.

Issue
In her union with Siemowit, Alexandra bore 13 children—five sons and eight daughters.

Sons:
 Kazimierz II of Masovia
 Trojden II of Masovia
 Władysław I of Płock
 Siemowit V of Masovia
 Alexander of Masovia; who was a diplomat and Bishop of Trento, titular Bishop of Chur, titular Cardinal of Damascus, and Patriarch of Aquileia.

Daughters:
 Euphemia of Masovia; married Bolesław I, Duke of Cieszyn
 Cymburgis of Masovia; married Ernest, Duke of Austria
 Jadwiga of Masovia; married John Garay, son of Nicholas I Garay
 Amelia of Masovia; married William II, Margrave of Meissen
 Anna of Masovia; possibly married Michael Žygimantaitis
 Maria of Masovia; married Bogislaw IX, Duke of Pomerania
 Alexandra of Masovia
 Catherine of Masovia; married Michael Žygimantaitis

Grandchildren of Alexandra and Siemowit IV included Frederick III, Holy Roman Emperor, Przemyslaus II, Duke of Cieszyn, Sophie of Pomerania, Duchess of Pomerania and Dorothy Garai.

References

Karol Piotrowicz, w: Polski Słownik Biograficzny/ Polish Biographical Dictionary. T. 1. Kraków: Polska Akademia Umiejętności – Skład Główny w Księgarniach Gebethnera i Wolffa, 1935, p. 66–67

External links

14th-century births
1434 deaths
Gediminids
Lithuanian princesses
Piast dynasty
14th-century Polish women
14th-century Polish people
15th-century Polish people
15th-century Polish women